Final league standings for the 1918-19 St. Louis Soccer League.

League standings

External links
St. Louis Soccer Leagues (RSSSF)
The Year in American Soccer - 1919

1918-19
1918–19 domestic association football leagues
1918–19 in American soccer
St Louis Soccer
St Louis Soccer
St Louis